Robert Louis may refer to:

 (1902-65), see Armorial of the Communes of Manche
Robert Louis-Dreyfus (1946-2009), French businessman

Fictional characters
 Bob Louis, a character in the 1993 television series The Detectives

See also

Robert Lewis (disambiguation)